Lucien H. Kerr (May 4, 1831 – October 31, 1873) was an American politician and soldier from Ohio. Coming with his family to Peoria County, Illinois, Kerr studied law but enlisted in the Union Army before getting the chance to practice. He rose to lead the 11th Regiment Illinois Volunteer Cavalry until he was mustered out in 1864. Upon his return to Peoria, Kerr practiced law. He served one two-year term in the Illinois Senate, then was defeated in a re-election bid. He died the next year from an injury from a hunting accident.

Biography
Lucien H. Kerr was born in London, Ohio, on May 4, 1831. The son of a prominent lawyer, Kerr studied at home and worked occasionally as a youth. He came with his family to a farm near Elmwood, Illinois. Kerr traded and shipped livestock in Elmwood, then moved to nearby Peoria to study law. Kerr was admitted to the bar around 1861, then almost immediately enlisted in the 11th Regiment Illinois Volunteer Cavalry of the Union Army. When the unit was deployed, Kerr was named its adjutant. He rose to the rank of major and lieutenant colonel, then assumed the full colonel when Col. Robert G. Ingersoll resigned after his capture. He was mustered out on December 19, 1864.

Upon his return to Peoria, Kerr practiced law. He made a public speech announcing his alignment with the Republican Party. In 1870, Kerr was elected to the Illinois Senate, where he served a two-year term. He was a candidate for re-election in 1872, but was unsuccessful. Kerr was appointed Peoria City Attorney, holding the position until his death.

In 1873, Kerr accidentally discharged his firearm while hunting, receiving a gunshot wound. An infection quickly spread and he died at the house of the Mayor of Peoria on October 31, 1873. He was buried at Springdale Cemetery in Peoria.

References

1831 births
1873 deaths
Deaths by firearm in Illinois
Firearm accident victims in the United States
Illinois lawyers
Republican Party Illinois state senators
People from London, Ohio
Politicians from Peoria, Illinois
People from Peoria County, Illinois
People of Illinois in the American Civil War
People of Ohio in the American Civil War
19th-century American politicians
Union Army colonels
Accidental deaths in Illinois
Hunting accident deaths